Stage to Tucson is a 1950 American Western film directed by Ralph Murphy and written by Robert Creighton Williams, Frank Burt and Robert Libott. It is based on the 1948 novel Lost Stage Valley by Frank Bonham. The film stars Rod Cameron, Wayne Morris, Kay Buckley, Sally Eilers, Carl Benton Reid and Roy Roberts. The film was released in December 1950, by Columbia Pictures.

Plot

Cast          
Rod Cameron as Grif Holbrook
Wayne Morris as Barney Broderick
Kay Buckley as Kate Crocker
Sally Eilers as Annie Benson
Carl Benton Reid as Dr. Noah Banteen
Roy Roberts as Jim Maroon
Harry Bellaver as Gus Heyden
Douglas Fowley as Ira Prentiss

References

External links
 

1950 films
American Western (genre) films
1950 Western (genre) films
Columbia Pictures films
Films directed by Ralph Murphy
Films scored by Paul Sawtell
1950s English-language films
1950s American films